Wijeratne Tikiri Bandara Karaliadda was a Ceylonese educator and politician.  

Karaliadda was elected to the 1st State Council of Ceylon on 13 June 1931, representing the electorate of Matale. He was a member of the Ceylon Labour Party.

References 

Date of birth missing
Sinhalese politicians
Members of the 1st State Council of Ceylon
Ceylon Labour Party politicians